Matson, Inc., is an American shipping and navigation services company headquartered in Honolulu, Hawaii. Founded in 1882, Matson, Inc.'s subsidiary Matson Navigation Company provides ocean shipping services across the Pacific to Hawaii, Alaska, Guam, Micronesia, the South Pacific, China, and Japan.

History
William Matson (1849–1917) founded Matson Navigation Company. He was born in Lysekil in Västra Götaland County, Sweden, and orphaned during childhood. He arrived in San Francisco after a trip around Cape Horn in 1867. Working aboard the Dickel family yacht, he struck up a friendship with tycoon Claus Spreckels, who financed many of Matson's new ships. In 1882, the three-masted schooner Emma Claudina ran to the Hawaiian Islands.

The enterprise began in the carrying of merchandise, especially of plantation stores, to the islands and returning with cargoes of sugar. This led to gradually expanding interests at both ends of the line.

In 1924, Matson completed the Matson Building at 215 Market Street in San Francisco. It featured an observation tower and cupola at the northern corner of the building that enabled company executives to see its ships coming through the Golden Gate. The company later sold the building to Pacific Gas and Electric Company, whose general office was next door at 245 Market. PG&E has incorporated the former Matson building into its general office complex, keeping Matson-specific details such as elevator doors with detailed maps of Hawaii on them.

For a brief period after World War II, Matson operated an airline using Douglas DC-4 aircraft between the Pacific Coast and Hawaii. The airline ultimately ceased operations because of political pressure from Pan American World Airways, which resulted in inability to obtain federal government scheduled operating authority.

On December 1, 2011, Matson's then-parent company Alexander & Baldwin announced that its board of directors approved a plan to split A&B and Matson into two separate companies. As part of the plan, Matson would leave Oakland, California, to become a Honolulu-based company. The two companies are now traded separately.

In 2015, Matson, Inc., acquired Horizon Lines, formerly its main competitor in the United States domestic market, for $469 million.

Passenger ships

Primarily a conveyor of freight, Matson also introduced into service a number of passenger liners to capitalize on the burgeoning tourist trade. In 1926, Matson took over the Oceanic Steamship Company, operating three trans-Pacific liners, including the SS Sonoma.

From the early 20th century through the 1970s, Matson liners sailed from the west coast ports of San Francisco and Los Angeles to Honolulu and points beyond, including a handful of South Pacific ports of call as well as Sydney, Australia and Auckland, New Zealand.

Among the "white ships of Matson" were Malolo (rechristened Matsonia), Lurline, Mariposa, and Monterey. With the advent and expansion of routine air travel between the mainland and the islands, Matson's passenger service was greatly diminished, and the liners were eventually retired from trans-Pacific service and virtually gone by the end of the 1970s.

Hotels
In 1925, Matson acquired a controlling interest in the historic Moana Hotel on Waikiki on the island of Oahu. They constructed the nearby Royal Hawaiian Hotel in 1927. In 1952, they built the SurfRider Hotel (today a wing of the Moana), followed by the Princess Kaiulani Hotel in 1955. They sold the four properties to Sheraton Hotels in 1959.

Current fleet 

Matson's current cargo fleet of U.S.-flagged vessels include:

 Anchorage / Kodiak / Tacoma (sister ships)
 Daniel K. Inouye
 Imua II / Liloa II (sister ships)
 Kaimana Hila
 Kamokuiki
 Lihue
 Lurline
 Manoa / Mahimahi
 Manulani / Maunawili / Manukai (sister ships)
 Maunalei
 Matsonia
 Mokihana
 Papa Mau
 R.J. Pfeiffer
 Haleakala
 Mauna Loa
 Waialeale

Gallery

See also
Young Brothers Hawaii
Pasha Hawaii
List of largest container shipping companies

References

Further reading

External links

 

 The last ocean liners of Matson lines
 The Ocean Linear Virtual Museum - Matson Lines

Shipping companies of the United States
Ferry companies of Hawaii
Transportation companies based in California
Water transportation in Hawaii
Companies based in Honolulu
Companies based in Oakland, California
Transport companies established in 1882
1882 establishments in California
Corporate spin-offs
2012 establishments in Hawaii
Dole plc
Companies in the Dow Jones Transportation Average
Companies listed on the New York Stock Exchange
Container shipping companies of the United States
Container shipping companies